Walter Thane Baker (born October 4, 1931) is an American former sprinter and winner of the gold medal in the 4x100 m relay at the 1956 Summer Olympics in Melbourne, Australia, with a new world record of 39.5 seconds.  At those Olympics Baker also won a silver medal in the 100-meter and a bronze in the 200-meter.  At the 1952 Summer Olympics in Helsinki, he won a silver medal in the 200-meter.

Biography
Baker was born in Elkhart, Kansas. Baker also won numerous conference titles at Kansas State, and was a four-time All American.

Before the Melbourne Olympics, Baker equaled Jesse Owens's long-standing 100 m world record time of 10.2 seconds, and also twice equaled the 200 m world record of 20.6.  He tied the world record in the 100 yd in 9.3 seconds, twice tied the world record in 60 yd indoor events at 6.1 seconds, and set the world record in the 300 yd at 29.4 seconds. He co-held several world records in relays.

After turning forty, Baker participated in the Masters Track and Field program and held numerous world records in the 100 yd, 100 m, 220 y, 200 m, and several relays in the age groups categories of 40–44, 45–49, and 50–54 years of age. Baker is enshrined in the USATF Masters Hall of Fame and the Kansas Sports Hall of Fame. He is also in the Kansas State University Sports Hall of Fame and the Kansas State High School Activities Hall of Fame.  In 1978, he was named a "Silver Athletics Top Ten" for personal achievement.

He began as a track meet "starter" in 1959 and has started NCAA National Championships and National Federation Championships. The year 2010 was his forty-fourth year of serving at the Texas Relays. He was selected "Outstanding Official" by the Texas Relays Committee in 2010 and inducted into the Texas Track and Field Coaches Hall of Fame, Class of 2011. He also has the track named after him in his home town of Elkhart, Kansas.

He retired in 1983 as a colonel from the United States Air Force after serving thirty years of active and reserve status.  Additionally, in 1992, he retired from Mobil Research and Development after thirty-nine years of employment. His civic involvement included serving as president of a Rotary Club chapter, a member of the Cotton Bowl Athletic Association board of directors, the United States Olympians board of directors, and volunteered on other boards and associations.

References

1931 births
Living people
People from Elkhart, Kansas
Track and field athletes from Kansas
Kansas State Wildcats men's track and field athletes
American male sprinters
World record setters in athletics (track and field)
Athletes (track and field) at the 1952 Summer Olympics
Athletes (track and field) at the 1956 Summer Olympics
Olympic bronze medalists for the United States in track and field
Olympic gold medalists for the United States in track and field
Olympic silver medalists for the United States in track and field
Athletic directors
American referees and umpires
Medalists at the 1956 Summer Olympics
Medalists at the 1952 Summer Olympics
American masters athletes